Baetis brunneicolor is a species of small minnow mayfly in the family Baetidae. It is found in all of Canada, the northern, and southeastern United States.

References

Further reading

 

Mayflies
Articles created by Qbugbot
Insects described in 1925